Ray Wynd (6 January 1921 – 19 February 2003) was an  Australian rules footballer who played with North Melbourne in the Victorian Football League (VFL).

Notes

External links 		
		
		
		
		
		
		
		
1921 births		
2003 deaths		
Australian rules footballers from Victoria (Australia)		
North Melbourne Football Club players